Meena Gokulas is an Indian voice actress who is known for voice acting in Indian animation and for contributing dubbing for foreign content in Hindi language. She is also a dubbing director, considering that she has directed some Hindi-dubbed productions for foreign content. She can speak English and Hindi.

She currently lives in Malabar Hill, Mumbai.

Dubbing career
As of 2014, she has been involved in the dubbing industry for about 28 years—she has been dubbing for foreign productions as early as 1986.

Meena Gokuldas has also given her voice for Bollywood movie Main Prem Ki Diwani Hoon for the parrot character Raja.

Filmography

Animated films

Dubbing roles

Animated series

Live action television series

Live action films

Animated films

References

External links
 

Year of birth missing (living people)
Actresses from Mumbai
Living people
Indian voice actresses
Indian voice directors
Actresses in Hindi cinema
Actresses in Hindi television
21st-century Indian actresses